Shin Min-a (born 5 April 1984) is a South Korean model and actress  best known for starring in television dramas A Love to Kill (2005),  My Girlfriend Is a Nine-Tailed Fox (2010), Arang and the Magistrate (2012), Oh My Venus (2015), Tomorrow, With You (2017), Hometown Cha-Cha-Cha (2021), and Our Blues (2022).

Career

Modeling
Shin began her career as a model for the teen magazine KiKi in 1998. She has since become one of the most in-demand and highest paid commercial endorsers in South Korea. Notable among her forays into branded entertainment is the 2008 multi-episode Summer Days opposite Hyun Bin and Ryoo Seung-bum for LG Xnote featuring music by You Hee-yeol, as well as Friends & Love, a movie-style extended advertisement for Giordano in 2011 costarring Jung Woo-sung and So Ji-sub.

In 2009, Shin went to Milan, Italy to shoot a photo spread for Elle Korea with Calvin Klein model Jamie Dornan. In 2011, she was chosen as the first Asian model for the DIY Project ad campaign of American clothing brand Rag & bone, then was subsequently featured in The New York Times'''s T Magazine.

Shin is Roger Vivier Maison Ambassador for Korea. Her most recent highend brand deal was Gucci's ambassador with Lee Jung-jae.

Acting
Shin started acting through appearance in several music videos for K-pop boyband g.o.d. She debut as actress in 2001 with a supporting role in popular melodrama, Beautiful Days. The newcomer quickly rose to stardom, through the high school martial arts comedy film Volcano High with Jang Hyuk, and the college romance movie Madeleine with Jo In-sung.

She then took on a supporting role in Kim Jee-woon's noir film A Bittersweet Life, reuniting her with previous co-star Lee Byung-hun. She then portrayed a deaf character in Sad Movie. This was followed by leading roles in the melodrama A Love to Kill with Rain, romantic comedy series The Beast and the Beauty with Ryoo Seung-bum, and psychological thriller The Devil with Uhm Tae-woong and Ju Ji-hoon. In the 2007 film My Mighty Princess, Shin simultaneously played two characters.

As Shin entered her mid-twenties, she began showcasing more maturity in her choice of roles. In Go Go 70s, Shin played a sexy counterculture singer and won numerous accolades for her portrayal. She then acted as an unfaithful wife in The Naked Kitchen, and a cynical young woman in search of her father in Sisters on the Road, a critically acclaimed indie film which also stars fellow actress and close friend Gong Hyo-jin. But Shin became best known for her portrayals of supernatural horror icons revamped into endearingly innocent yet spunky heroines in the rom-com My Girlfriend Is a Nine-Tailed Fox (2010), and the historical drama Arang and the Magistrate (2012).

After appearing in The X, a 2013 spy thriller short film directed by Kim Jee-woon, Shin returned to the big screen in 2014 in Gyeongju, an introspective arthouse romance opposite Park Hae-il. This was followed by romantic comedy film My Love, My Bride, in which she and Jo Jung-suk played a newly married couple; it was a remake of the same-titled 1990 hit which starred Choi Jin-sil and Park Joong-hoon.

In 2015, Shin and So Ji-sub were cast in the romantic comedy series Oh My Venus. For her character, an overweight lawyer, Shin underwent a three-hour makeup/prosthetic session every shoot. Shin won Excellence Award, Actress in a Miniseries and with So Ji-sub, Shin won Best Couple Award from 2015 KBS Drama Awards. She also won Outstanding Korean Actress in 11th Seoul International Drama Awards.

In 2016, Shin is cast opposite Lee Je-hoon in fantasy melodrama, Tomorrow, With You, portraying a 30-year-old amateur photographer who finds out that her better half can time travel. The drama was fully pre-produced and premiered in February 2017.

Shin took a break from acting for two years. In 2018, Shin was cast opposite Lee Yoo-young in the mystery film Diva, playing Yi Young, a diver who lost her memory after an accident. The film marks the directorial debut of Cho Seul-ye. It was showcased in Korean Fantastic features section at 25th Bucheon International Fantastic Film Festival held in July 2021.

In 2019, Shin back to small screen after three years. She acted in the political drama Chief of Staff opposite Lee Jung-jae; as Kang Seon-yeong, a lawyer turned politician. In winter 2019, Shin reprised her role for the second season.

In 2021, Shin reunited with director Yoo Je-won in Hometown-Cha-Cha-Cha, starring Kim Seon-ho and Lee Sang-yi. She played the role Yoon Hye-jin, a self-made dentist who moved from the city to open a clinic in the seaside village of Gongjin. It was a remake of 2004 film Mr. Handy, Mr. Hong which starred Uhm Jung-hwa and Kim Joo-hyuk. The series became a domestic hit with audience ratings peaking at 13.322% and went on to become one of the highest-rated television series on Korean cable television history. Following its release on Netflix, Hometown Cha-Cha-Cha became one of the platform's most-watched non-English television shows. It remained on Netflix's non-English popular television show list for 16 weeks, and reached the top 10 charts in more than 20 countries. It also on Netflix's Top 10 Chart for television shows for more than two months from its last episode.

In October 2021, Shin went to Jeju Island to film Noh Hee-kyung's omnibus drama Our Blues, starring Lee Byung-hun, Cha Seung-won, Lee Jung-eun, Uhm Jung-hwa, Han Ji-min, and Kim Woo-bin. Shin played Min Seon-ah, a divorcee with one child who came to Jeju and met her childhood friend Lee Dong-seok. It premiered on tvN on April 9, 2022, and aired every Saturday and Sunday at 21:10 (KST) with 20 episodes.

Others
After her travels were documented on the cable channel O'live in 2008, Shin published a book titled Shin Min-a's French Diary'' in 2009.

She has also contributed her vocals to several singles and soundtracks.

Personal life
Since May 2015, Shin has been in a relationship with model-actor Kim Woo-bin. They met each other as models for the same fashion brand.

Philanthropy 
In 2010, Shin donated 50 million won to build Korea's first multicultural school in Ansan, Gyeonggi Province. In August 2014, she participated in the Ice Bucket Challenge, a fundraising campaign underway by US ALS Association to develop treatments for ALS and to help patients.

In 2015, it was reported that Shin had donated a total of 1 billion won over past 7 years through 'Fruit of Love', a social welfare community chest and  'Good Friends' an association that helps North Korean defectors. In November 2016, she participated in 'Let's Share the Heart' talent donation: a campaign to raise funds for Hallym Burn Foundation.

In September 2019, Shin donated 50 million won to Seoul National University Children's Hospital. On October 29, 2019, at 4th Finance Day Commemoration Ceremony, Shin received the Presidential Citation in recognition of her consistent donations.

In February 2020, Shin donated 100 million won to the Seoul Community Chest of Korea (Seoul Fruit of Love) to be used for medical staff and vulnerable groups who are working hard to prevent the spread of COVID-19.In August, she donated 50 million to the Fruit of Love to help the victims of torrential rain. In December 2020, Shin donated 100 million won through the Hallym Burn Foundation, which she had been practising every year since 2015.

In December 2021, it was reported that she has donated 100 million won each to the Hallym Burn Foundation, Seoul Asan Hospital and to the Korean Developmental Society for psychological treatment of children suffering from the prolonged COVID-19 infection. In March 2022, Shin donated 100 million won to the Hope Bridge Disaster Relief Association to help the victims of the massive wildfire that started in Uljin County, North Gyeongsang Province, and has spread to Samcheok, Gangwon Province.

In December 2022, it was reported that Shin Min-ah's cumulative donation amount exceeds 3.3 billion won. Since 2009, Shin steadily donates to the cause such as supporting low-income youth and children with childhood cancer. In March, Shin donated 100 million won to the Hope Bridge National Disaster Relief Association to help restore forest fire damage. Shin also donated a total of 260 million won for the end of the year, to institutions where She used donate every year, such as Fruit of Love and Asan Medical Center in Seoul. Shin put out 360 million won this year alone.

On February 8, 2023, Shin donated 50 million won to help 2023 Turkey–Syria earthquake, by donating money through Hope Bridge Disaster Relief Society.

Filmography

Film

Television series

Music video appearances

Discography

Awards and nominations

Listicles

Notes

References

External links

 Shin Min-a official website 
 
 
 

 

South Korean film actresses
South Korean television actresses
South Korean female models
IHQ (company) artists
1984 births
Living people
Dongguk University alumni